Hohol is an alternative form of khokhol, an ethnic slur for Ukrainians popular in Russia and other Russian-speaking communities. It is also a Ukrainian Cossack surname.

Notable people with the surname include:

 Mykola Hohol, Ukrainian-Russian author, also known as Nikolai Gogol
 Bert Hohol, a Canadian provincial level politician from Alberta

See also
 

Ukrainian words and phrases
Ukrainian-language surnames